Amanda Boulier (born March 30, 1993) is an American ice hockey player and coach, currently playing in the Premier Hockey Federation (PHF; previously NWHL) with the Minnesota Whitecaps. She holds the NWHL/PHF record for most career goals scored by a defenseman.

Career 
St. Lawrence won the Eastern College Athletic Conference in her rookie NCAA season, where she scored 20 points in 38 games and was named to the ECAC All-Rookie Team. After missing the 2013–14 season due to injury, Boulier returned to the St. Lawrence lineup and was named team captain.

In 2017, she signed with the Connecticut Whale of the NWHL. After just one year with the Whale, she signed with the Minnesota Whitecaps, where she would win the Isobel Cup. be named a finalist for Defender of the Year and one of the Fans’ Three Stars of the Season in 2019. She has been named to the NWHL All-Star Game three times.

In June 2020, she became the first defender to re-sign with the Whitecaps for the 2020–21 NWHL season. She chose to opt-out of the COVID-19 bubble season, however.

In September 2021, she announced that she had signed with the defending Isobel Cup champions, the Boston Pride.

International career 
Boulier represented the United States at the 2011 IIHF World Women's U18 Championship, putting up four points in five games as the country won gold.

Coaching career 
From 2016 to 2018, Boulier served as an assistant coach for the NCAA Division I Yale Bulldogs. During her time with the Whale, she also served as a coach with Chelsea Piers Connecticut. In April 2020, she was named head coach for the Marshall School's girls' ice hockey team.

Career Statistics

References

External links

1993 births
Living people
American women's ice hockey defensemen
Boston Pride players
Connecticut Whale (PHF) players
Ice hockey players from Connecticut
Isobel Cup champions
Minnesota Whitecaps players
People from Watertown, Connecticut
St. Lawrence Saints women's ice hockey players